Ana Tejada Jiménez (born 2 June 2002) is a Spanish professional footballer who plays as a centre back for Liga F club Real Sociedad and the Spain women's national team.

Club career
Raised in the village of Lumbreras in La Rioja, Tejada started her career at Logroño, where she was already playing for the first team when they achieved promotion to the Primera División in 2018, making her the youngest active player in the top league, aged barely 16. A solid campaign with Logroño led to her being signed by Real Sociedad in 2019. With her first campaign in San Sebastián interrupted by injury and then the COVID-19 pandemic in Spain, she became a regular for the txuri-urdin in the 2020–21 season, starting 24 matches.

International career
Tejada was a member of the Spain under-17 squad that qualified for the UEFA Women's Under-17 Championship in May 2018 (Lithuania) and the FIFA U-17 Women's World Cup played six months later (Uruguay), winning both competitions. She was still young enough to play in the 2019 Under-17 Euros (Bulgaria) and was named in the 'Team of the Tournament', as she had been in the previous year. She later won the 2022 FIFA U-20 Women's World Cup and made her senior debut on 11 November 2022, being a 76th-minute substitution in a 7-0 friendly home win over Argentina.

References

External links
Profile at Real Sociedad

2002 births
Living people
Women's association football defenders
Spanish women's footballers
Footballers from La Rioja (Spain)
Sportspeople from Logroño
EdF Logroño players
Real Sociedad (women) players
Primera División (women) players
Spain women's youth international footballers
Spain women's international footballers